Ehoron.com ("ehoron" means "homeland" in English) was a Inner Mongolia-based online discussion forum for Mongolian students. Established in September 2004, it allowed students to discuss many topics affecting Inner Mongolia.

Shut down
Ehoron.com was shut down by the Chinese government on 26 September 2005, for "allegedly hosting separatist content".

References 

Defunct websites
Internet censorship
Internet properties established in 2004
Internet properties disestablished in 2005
Chinese Internet forums